Swinford GAA is a Gaelic Athletic Association club based in Swinford, County Mayo.
They play in Mayo Intermediate Football Championship and belong to the East Division.

History
Originally there were three clubs in Swinford area,  "The Commercials", "The Sextons" and then also "The Young Ireland". There's no evidence about the foundation of a unique club, but Swinford contested the Mayo final, the first and only one, in 1889, when they lost against Ballina Stephenites GAA.

The club has never won a major football trophy, neither a county title.
Unlikely, they have won in 1956 a Mayo hurling trophy.

Swinford has been more successful with minor teams, collecting a Junior Final in 1949 and a Minor Title in 1951.

Honours
 Mayo Senior Hurling Championship: 1956
 Mayo Senior Football Championship: Runners-Up 1899
 Mayo Junior Football Championship Runner-Up 1949
 Mayo Minor Football Championship: 1951

References

External sources
Club Website

Gaelic football clubs in County Mayo
Gaelic games clubs in County Mayo